Carlos Fredy Soto Sandoval (born 10 November 1959) is a Chilean former professional footballer who played as a defender for clubs in Chile and Mexico.

Club career
A product of Ñublense youth system, he stayed with the club until the 1982 season. In the Chilean Primera División, he also played for Palestino, Colo-Colo, Universidad de Chile, Deportes Antofagasta and Regional Atacama, his last club. Along with Colo-Colo, he won the 1985 Copa Polla Gol. In addition, as a player of Regional Atacama, he took part in the match where Colo-Colo gave the biggest hammering in its history, a 10–0 win, on 27 August 1995.

Abroad he played in Mexico between 1987 and 1991 for both Tampico Madero and Querétaro. In Tampico Madero, he coincided with his compatriot Mariano Puyol.

International career
Soto made two appearances and scored a goal for the Chile national team at friendly matches in 1987.

Honours
Colo-Colo
 Copa Polla Gol: 1985

References

External links
 
 Carlos Soto at PlaymakerStats.com
 Carlos Soto at PartidosdeLaRoja.com  

1959 births
Living people
People from Temuco
Chilean footballers
Chilean expatriate footballers
Chile international footballers
Ñublense footballers
Club Deportivo Palestino footballers
Colo-Colo footballers
Tampico Madero F.C. footballers
Querétaro F.C. footballers
Universidad de Chile footballers
C.D. Antofagasta footballers
Regional Atacama footballers
Primera B de Chile players
Chilean Primera División players
Liga MX players
Chilean expatriate sportspeople in Mexico
Expatriate footballers in Mexico
Association football defenders